Maurice Hill may refer to:

 Maurice Hill (actor) (19182007), American actor in the film Bengazi
 Maurice Hill (cricketer) (born 1935), English cricketer
 Maurice Hill (criminal) (born c. 1983), suspect in August 2019 Philadelphia shooting
 Maurice Hill (geophysicist) (19191966), British marine geophysicist
 Maurice Hill (judge) (18621934), British judge